Teratocephalidae is a family of nematodes belonging to the order Araeolaimida.

Genera:
 Euteratocephalus Andrássy, 1958
 Teratocephalus de Man, 1876

References

Nematodes